Dolichoderus quadripunctatus is a species of ant in the genus Dolichoderus. Described by Carl Linnaeus in 1771, the species is present all over Europe and Asia.

References

Dolichoderus
Hymenoptera of Asia
Hymenoptera of Europe
Insects described in 1771
Taxa named by Carl Linnaeus